Look Who's Dropped In was a four-part Australian television variety series which aired on Sydney station ABN-2. The half-hour series presented jazz music, competing in the time-slot against Pick a Box on ATN-7 and U.S. series Racket Squad on TCN-9. It aired fortnightly from 14 December 1957 to 25 January 1958, alternating with Tele-Variety. It is worth noting that ABC variety series of the era typically had shorter seasons than those on commercial television. The series featured George Trevare.

References

External links

1957 Australian television series debuts
1958 Australian television series endings
Australian Broadcasting Corporation original programming
Black-and-white Australian television shows
English-language television shows
Australian variety television shows